Hope Street is an Irish crime serial drama filmed in Donaghadee, Northern Ireland. Starring an ensemble cast almost entirely collected from the local area, including Amara Karan, Ciarán McMenamin, Kerri Quinn, Niall Wright, Des McAleer, Brid Brennan, Aaron McCusker and Niamh McGrady.

Premise
The first series sees the sudden arrival of DC Leila Hussain (Amara Karan) in the fictional Northern Irish town of Port Devine. The local residents question the reason behind her arrival; only Inspector Finn O'Hare knows why Leila has been transferred, but is keeping it to himself.

On Leila's arrival to the town, Karan hinted: "The secret, the reason why she's been brought to Northern Ireland, is actually a matter of life-and-death". Each episode follows a self-contained crime story following the investigation of the local police department, as well as the exploits of the town's local residents. 

In the second series, a former colleague of Finn's, DC Al Quinn, is sent to town as part of an undercover operation. Following the operation's conclusion, Al stays in town to fill the void left following Leila's departure. When his daughter is caught up in the theft of an ATM, Al crosses the line to protect the one he loves most, putting his career on the line in the process.

Cast
 Amara Karan as DC Leila Hussain (Series 1)
 Stephen Hagan as DC Al Quinn (Series 2—)
 Ciarán McMenamin as Inspector Finn O'Hare
 Kerri Quinn as Sergeant Marlene Pettigrew
 Niall Wright as PC Callum McCarthy
 Brid Brennan as Concepta O'Hare
 Des McAleer as Barry Pettigrew
 Aaron McCusker as Clint Dunwoody-Devine
 Niamh McGrady as Nicole Dunwoody-Devine
 Rachel Tucker as Siobhan O'Hare
 Ellie Lavery as Niamh O'Hare
 Louis McCartney as Shay O'Hare

Development
Series co-creator and co-executive producer Paul Marquess stated that his aim whilst creating the series was to make a long-running, local drama. Due to being born in Belfast, he wanted to avoid the stereotypes that come with Northern Irish media portrayals, instead focusing on the "humour and warmth" of the area. Marquess and colleague Susan Farrell decided that the series should not focus on serial killers or the Troubles, but instead on the resilience of the community in Northern Ireland. Another of Marquess' aims was to increase the amount of television productions in Northern Ireland, specifically since he had moved from the country to pursue a career in production in his youth. He and Farrell created a cast and crew almost entirely formed of local talent from in and around Donaghadee, where the series is filmed. The 10-episode first series was funded by Northern Ireland Screen and it was confirmed that it would premiere on BBC One Northern Ireland in November 2021, as well as having a January 2022 broadcast on BBC One in the other regions of the United Kingdom.

Cast member McMenamin was helped with his research about the police by two schoolfriends who are part of the Police Service of Northern Ireland (PSNI). After reading the scripts for the series, he was excited to be part of Hope Street due to its modern-day portrayal of his community. He said that his experiences on set are the happiest moments of his professional life, due to the locations they film on and the cast and crew. McMenamin explained: "The craic is a different level. When you live away, to come home and be surrounded by people just as sarcastic as you, makes getting out of bed in the morning a joy". Quinn opined that it is refreshing for Hope Street not to mention the Troubles and appreciated that the scripts place a focal point on relationships and the small community of Port Devine. Wright echoed her comments, feeling that the serial drama is "a completely different take" to other dramas on television at the time of transmission. He added that the series would have plenty of twists and cliffhangers and hoped that the series would be renewed for several further series. English cast member Karan said that whilst filming for the series, the locals of Donaghadee were very proud of their town, but "went out of their way to make [her] feel welcome". She added that she loved playing Leila even though she "sticks out in her new environment like a sore thumb".

On 14 April 2022, the show was renewed for a second series, which premiered in November 2022, with Stephen Hagan taking on the role of new lead character, DC Al Quinn.

Episodes

Series 1 (2021–2022)

Series 2 (2022–2023)

Reception
On the Northern Irish BBC iPlayer, Hope Street received 1.6million streams on the first five episodes of series one. Stephen Patterson, writing for the Metro, gave the series four stars out of a possible five. He wrote that within minutes of the first episode, the community-driven aspect is established "incredibly well". Patterson noted that the core cast are talented, praising McGrady specifically for "stealing every scene she's in". He also praised the standalone stories in each episode, feeling that they raise important issues in ways that he did not expect from the series. He opined that Marquess had succeeded in his aims for the series to accurately portray Northern Ireland. He added that despite serial dramas such as Red Rock, The Bill and Holby City losing popularity, Hope Street "suggests that there is still something of an appetite for this kind of programming", also hoping for more series of the programme.

References

External links
 
 
 

2021 British television series debuts
2020s British crime drama television series
2020s British police procedural television series
2020s British workplace drama television series
BBC crime drama television shows
BBC Daytime television series
BritBox original programming
English-language television shows
Television shows filmed in Northern Ireland
Television shows set in Northern Ireland